O'Hara may refer to:

Place names
Cardinal O'Hara High School (Springfield, Pennsylvania), United States
Lake O'Hara, a lake in Yoho National Park, British Columbia, Canada
O'Hara Glacier, a glacier in Antarctica
O'Hara Township, Allegheny County, Pennsylvania, United States

Other uses
O'Hara, an 1825 novel by William Hamilton Maxwell
O'Hara (surname)
O'Hara, U.S. Treasury, a 1970s crime television series 
The People Against O'Hara, a 1951 film starring Spencer Tracy 
The Book of O'Hara  (Leabhar Í Eadhra), a 1951 collection of poetry from the royal O'Hara family, edited by Lambert McKenna

See also
Ohara (disambiguation)
O'Hare (disambiguation)
Justice O'Hara (disambiguation)